Oshiogawa stable (押尾川部屋, Oshiogawa-beya) is a stable of sumo wrestlers, one of the Nishonoseki group of stables. It broke off from Oguruma stable by its founder, former sekiwake Takekaze, and officially opened in February 2022. The planned opening of the stable was first announced in April 2021, and was prompted by the imminent retirement of the head of Oguruma stable, former ōzeki Kotokaze, who turned 65 years of age in April 2022.As of January 2023 it had six wrestlers.

Ring name conventions
Oshiogawa has announced that all his recruits will have the kanji  as a prefix in their shikona. In Oguruma stable, it was used as a suffix.

Owners
2022–Present: Oshiogawa Akira (shunin, former sekiwake Takekaze)

Notable active wrestlers

Yago (best rank maegashira)
Amakaze (best rank maegashira)

Coaches
Oguruma Koichi (riji, former ōzeki Kotokaze)

Assistant
 (sewanin, former makushita, real name Yasuyuki Adachi)

Hairdresser
Tokogō (1st class tokoyama)

Location and access
Tokyo, Sumida ward, Bunka 3-6-3
6 minute walk from Omurai Station on Tobu Kameido Line

See also
 Heya
 Japan Sumo Association
 List of active sumo wrestlers
 List of past sumo wrestlers
 List of sumo stables
 List of sumo elders
 List of yokozuna
 Toshiyori

References

External links
Oshiogawa stable page at Japan Sumo Association
Home page

Active sumo stables